Oriental Bay is a bay and suburb of Wellington, the capital city of New Zealand. Noted for being both a popular beach and a luxurious centre of affluence in the city, it is located close to the Central Business District on Wellington Harbour.

It has the closest beach to the central city and is thus a common destination for locals, who swarm here especially in the warmer months (December to March). Painted ladies and other historic houses, such as those in distinctly Wellingtonian streamline moderne style, are prominent alongside and up into the hills that face the bay. Situated against the northern slope of Mount Victoria, the suburb lies 1.5 kilometres southeast of the city centre, at the start of a coastal route which continues past Hataitai around Evans Bay. Originally named Duppa Bay, after its sole original resident George Duppa, in 1843 it was rechristened after one of the first ships to bring settlers to Wellington- the Oriental. Originally described as a remote "dreary-looking spot" of rocks lying between cliffs and the sea used primarily for quarantining foreigners, it has undergone considerable renovation since colonisation's early stages. Many landmarks were built over the 20th century, such as the grand streamlined moderne houses like the Olympus building and the Anscombe Apartments, and the modernist Freyberg pool built in the 1960s (which jets out onto the harbour and is named about Lord Freyberg, who adored the beach as a young man). However, the beach's greatest renovation came in 2004, when 22,000 tonnes of sand was shipped especially from Golden Bay to rebuild the beach, which had become worn down over many years.

In the summer months, Oriental Bay becomes a hive of activity. The beach seems covered with swimmers, party goers and families. The Carter Fountain is a distinctive feature in the Bay, as is the wooden barge which is often covered in swimmers. A small section of the bay that lies beside Freyberg pool is known as Freyberg Bay, after Lord Freyberg.

History
Oriental Bay was originally known as Duppa, after the first and only resident at the time, George Duppa who later renamed the area Oriental Bay after the ship that he arrived in New Zealand on in 1840. The area was originally farm land and was used as a quarantine with a nurse and tent on the beach and by whalers, which resulted in a pungent odor from the boiled whale blubber.

Settlement of the area started in the 1880s and was expanded with the development of public amenities in the early 1900s such as the Te Aro Baths and the Band Rotunda in 1918.

21st century
The beach was developed in 2004 by Wellington City Council with 22,000 tonnes of sand from Wainui Bay in Golden Bay being used to expand both Oriental and Freyberg beach.

Oriental Bay is a site for topless sunbathing. In December 2016, a Free The Nipple Beach Day was held there.

Demographics 

Oriental Bay had a population of 1,389 at the 2018 New Zealand census, an increase of 6 people (0.4%) since the 2013 census, and a decrease of 39 people (−2.7%) since the 2006 census. There were 666 households. There were 660 males and 729 females, giving a sex ratio of 0.91 males per female. The median age was 50 years (compared with 37.4 years nationally), with 66 people (4.8%) aged under 15 years, 336 (24.2%) aged 15 to 29, 579 (41.7%) aged 30 to 64, and 408 (29.4%) aged 65 or older.

Ethnicities were 86.6% European/Pākehā, 5.0% Māori, 1.1% Pacific peoples, 10.8% Asian, and 3.7% other ethnicities (totals add to more than 100% since people could identify with multiple ethnicities).

The proportion of people born overseas was 30.2%, compared with 27.1% nationally.

Although some people objected to giving their religion, 50.1% had no religion, 38.0% were Christian, 0.9% were Hindu, 0.2% were Muslim, 0.6% were Buddhist and 3.7% had other religions.

Of those at least 15 years old, 714 (54.0%) people had a bachelor or higher degree, and 66 (5.0%) people had no formal qualifications. The median income was $57,000, compared with $31,800 nationally. The employment status of those at least 15 was that 687 (51.9%) people were employed full-time, 174 (13.2%) were part-time, and 24 (1.8%) were unemployed.

Notable residents
 Sam Neill – Actor (Home situated in Upper Roseneath)
 Bob Hoskins – Actor ($1.5 Million (US) Duplex on Oriental Parade)
 Kerry Prendergast – Former Mayor of Wellington (Penthouse Apartment on Oriental Parade)
 Jane Campion – Academy Award-Winning Film Maker ($2.3 million (US) Apartment on Oriental Terrace)
 Robyn Kahukiwa – International Maori/New Zealand Artist
 Emily Watson – Actress ($1.2 million (US) Condo on Oriental Parade)

Images of Oriental Bay

References

Suburbs of Wellington City
Populated places around the Wellington Harbour
Beaches of the Wellington Region